Graham Central Station is the self-titled debut album by former Sly and the Family Stone bass player  Larry Graham's new band, "Graham Central Station".

Background

In late 1972, Larry Graham quit Sly and the Family Stone  because of tension between Larry and group leader Sly Stone. After agreeing to produce a band named Hot Chocolate (not to be confused with British pop band Hot Chocolate), he decided to join the band and  renamed them Graham Central Station in 1973.

Reception

Released in 1974, the album peaked at number twenty on the Billboard Top Soul Albums charts while single, "Can You Handle It?" peaked at #9 on the Billboard Soul Singles chart.

Covers and samples
"People" was sampled by Das EFX and KAM while "It Ain't No Thang to Me" was sampled by Da Lench Mob. The Graham Central Station also covered Al Green's "It Ain't No Fun to Me" on the album.
The line "People, people, people" was also used on Santana's Supernatural as part of "The Calling"

Track listing 
All songs written by Larry Graham except where indicated

"We've Been Waiting" – 0:58
"It Ain't No Fun To Me" (Al Green) – 5:11
"Hair" – 4:55 	
"We Be's Gettin' Down" – 4:42
"Tell Me What It Is" – 5:56
"Can You Handle It?" – 5:12 	
"People" (Larry Graham, Freddie Stone) – 4:30
"Why?" – 3:37 	
"Ghetto" – 4:24

Personnel

Musicians
Graham Central Station
Larry Graham – bass, fuzz bass, guitar, piano, Clavinet, organ, drums, lead and backing vocals, horn arrangements
Freddie Stone – guitar
Hershall "Happiness" Kennedy – clavinet, trumpet
Willie "Wild" Sparks – drums
David "Dynamite" Vega – guitar
Robert "Butch" Sam – piano, organ
Patryce "Choc'Let" Banks – vocals, drum programming, electric funk box
with:
Pascal Caboose - tenor saxophone
Milt Holland – percussion
Lenny Williams – vocals
Clarence McDonald – string arrangements

Technical
Steve Barncard, Donn Landee, Mallory Earl, Tom Flye - engineer
Mike Salisbury - cover design
Herb Greene – photography

Charts

Singles

External links
 Graham Central Station-Graham Central Station at Discogs

References

1974 debut albums
Graham Central Station albums
Albums produced by Russ Titelman
Warner Records albums